Kiel Township is a township in Lake of the Woods County, Minnesota, United States. The population was one at the 2010 census.

Geography

Demographics
As of the census of 2000, there were 6 people, 5 households, and 1 family residing in the township. The population density was 0.2 people per square mile (0.1/km). There were 20 housing units at an average density of 0.6/sq mi (0.2/km). The racial makeup of the township was 100% White.

There were 5 households, out of which none had children under the age of 18 living with them, 20.0% were married couples living together, and 80.0% were non-families. 80.0% of all households were made up of individuals, and none had someone living alone who was 65 years of age or older. The average household size was 1.20 and the average family size was 2.00.

In the township the population was spread out, with 33.3% from 25 to 44, 33.3% from 45 to 64, and 33.3% who were 65 years of age or older. The median age was 58 years. For every 100 females, there were 500.0 males. For every 100 females age 18 and over, there were 500.0 males.

References

Townships in Lake of the Woods County, Minnesota
Townships in Minnesota